Friendship Dolls were an international gift exchange between Japan and United States in 1927.  or Japanese ambassador dolls and the  were sent between Japan and the United States.  The dolls were meant to improve the deteriorated relationship between Japan and America. The worsening relationship resulted from the Immigration Act of Japan in 1924. This originated in anti-Japanese exclusion movements in California and other parts of the US.

The Friendship dolls’ real purpose was not to make Japanese children happy, as commonly thought, but actually to inspire American children to cultivate true friendship toward Japan. This movement helped to build world peace in the future, and it was based on each other’s cultural understandings and favored the generation of children.

Context 
The Immigration Act of 1924 prohibited East Asians from immigrating to the United States, which increased tension between the US and Japan. The worsening relationship originated in anti-Japanese exclusion movements in California and other parts of the US.

The project
Dr. Sidney Gulick was a former missionary who spent time in Japan between 1888 and 1913. He was familiar with how important dolls are in Japanese culture, and to promote goodwill between the countries he initiated a program to send dolls from the US to children in Japan. Gulick participated in forming a group called the Committee on World Friendship Among Children. In 1927, the first project was to organize the sending of 12,739 friendship dolls, also known as American blue-eyed dolls to Japan. These dolls arrived in time for Hinamatsuri, the annual Japanese doll festival.

There were organizations which mainly dealt with the project. The Committee on World Friendship Among Children played an important role in this project. This committee was established by the Federal Council of the Churches of Christ in America, and the Commission on International Justice and Goodwill. Then, Sidney Lewis Gulick and Eiichi Shibusawa played a central role in the plan. Gulick was an American missionary. Shibusawa was not just a Japanese rich businessman but a leader of the modernized private economy. 

Gulick and Shibusawa failed to amend to the Immigration Act of Japan and cooperated through the Friendship Dolls project to improve the relationship between Japan and the US. In a letter dated from April fifteenth, 1928, Gulick wrote to Eiichi Shibusawa about changing into a policy to relieve the anti-Japanese sentiment of the American people without touching the immigration laws, especially focusing on the children's understanding of Japanese culture. 

The children was actively featured in the mass media as messengers of peace and the main characters of touching tales. The reason why the project focused on children is that the media firmly established the image of clean and innocent children in the people. The composition that the pure children thought about the happiness of the neighboring country and wished for friendship and peace was completed by the Friendship Dolls. The media at that time learned about that through the successful experience of the Friendship Dolls. After that, children were a symbol which featured peace in the world, for instance, in the goodwill exchange between Japan and Manchuria. That way to utilize children as a peaceful symbol was a very effective to be accepted favorably by the people. Entrusting the improvement of the relationship between Japan and the United States to the future children through the Friendship Dolls might seem romantic at first sight, but from a different perspective, it showed hopelessness toward adults. Gulick believed that a deeper understanding of different cultures from children's age could prevent the friction created by cultural prejudice. This corresponded to the preface, “The Purpose of the Project”, in the report named “Doll of Friendship” of the Committee on World Friendship Among Children. The preface stated that there is no other way for eternal world peace other than education. There were several ways to interest children, however, sending friendly messages directly to the children who are far away, together with a “doll friendship” was perceived as the best way.

Inspired by this act of goodwill, Viscount Eiichi Shibusawa led a collection in Japan to reciprocate for this gift. The best doll makers in Japan were commissioned to produce 58 friendship dolls. Each doll was 32-33 inches tall and were dressed in beautiful kimono made of silk. Each doll also came with unique accessories. These Japanese friendship dolls represented specific Japanese prefectures, cities or regions. The dolls were sent to libraries and museums throughout the United States.

The plan about the Friendship Dolls was gradually proceeded. In a short period of time, 22,379 dolls were collected from 47 of the 48 states in the United States. In fact, 11,975 dolls were sent for Japanese children according to the historical materials of Eiichi Shibusawa. This is because of the policy, “sending excellent products even in small numbers” by the Committee on World Friendship Among Children. But, on the other hand, many ordinary people said that the plan to promote the international relationship by exchanging the dolls was nonsense.

Japanese vs American dolls 
There are a big difference to use dolls by American and Japanese children. Dolls for American were basically mannequins to decorate shop windows or toys for children, but dolls for Japanese went beyond the American basics and have many facets. Japanese dolls were used for purification and holding the belief that they could possess spirits within them. Japan also has a beautiful cultural festival for children’s dolls called “Hina Matsuri” in Japanese. In the festival, children could generally decorate their own dolls freely at that time. Gulick had knowledge about Japanese dolls’ multi-sided roles for children, so he discovered the possibility of cross-cultural exchange. According to DOLL MESSENGERS of FRIENDSHIP published by The Committee on World Friendship Among Children, publishers firstly suggested that American children at schools and homes should know a lot about the beautiful festival (Hina Matsuri), the Japanese love for children and family, and be familiar with the country of Japan. They secondly proposed exchanging American dolls for Japanese ones and making the American dolls be Messengers and Ambassadors to communicate children’s feelings of friendship toward Japanese. They also asked American parents and teachers to utilize the plan of exchanging the dolls as an educationally beneficial event.

Design and production 
Friendship Dolls’ structure had various features. The dolls were durable, safe, sanitary, reasonable and the latest designs. They were called American Composition Dolls and very popular at that time. The Dolls were made in consultation with three doll makers: Averill Manufacturing Co., Effanbee, and E.I. Horsman & Co. The Dolls had some features, for instance, they were new, made in the United States, wearing beautiful clothes that could be washed, approximately 30 cm in height, had mobile limbs, eyes that could blink called Sleeping Eye, sewn hair, cotton-filled torso, included a voice feature that said “mom”, and special friendship display dolls. They represented a part of the rise of American culture at that time. Some of friendship dolls are other than three companies, which were made from German bisque dolls, other manufactures, and unknown companies. Therefore, it was found that children brought their favorite dolls individually as “Hina Matsuri”.

American Blue-eyed dolls

In 1927, children in the United States sent over 12,000 Friendship Dolls to Japanese elementary school children as a gesture of friendship. Dolls were donated by churches and schools around the country and suggested to have a "Mama voice" and cost not more than $3.00. Each doll was sent with a message including the name of the doll, the names of the givers and the address for the "thank you" letter. Dolls were given farewell parties and given "passports" that cost 1 cent and "railroad and steamer tickets" that cost 99 cents. It was suggested that "girls specialize on the selection of the dolls and the making of their clothing and that boys serve as business and ticket agents." Dolls were also accompanied with a poem written by Robert Underwood Johnson titled Friends Across the Sea which was written at the request of the Committee of World Friendship among Children. Fewer than 100 of the dolls were sent to Formosa and divided amongst the ethnically segregated elementary schools and kindergartens. Displayed with their own passport, only 334 dolls survived WWII and are now are preserved with the best care in Japan.

Japanese dolls

Over the years, a few dolls were lost or are missing, but many are still on display today. Those whose locations are known include:
 Miss Aichi, sent to Nashville, Tennessee, was lost for decades but rediscovered in 2014 and returned to Japan
 Miss Akita at the Detroit Children's Museum in Detroit
 Miss Aomori, in a private collection
 Miss Chiba, sent to Riverside, California, present location unknown
 Miss Chosen at the Brauer Museum of Art in Valparaiso, Indiana
 Miss Dai Nippon (Miss Japan) at the Department of Anthropology, National Museum of Natural History, Smithsonian Institution in Washington, D.C.
 Miss Ehime, at Gulfport, Mississippi, destroyed in Hurricane Camille and replaced in 1988
 Miss Fukui, sent to Salt Lake City, present location unknown
 Miss Fukuoka at the Jordan Schnitzer Museum of Art in Eugene, Oregon
 Miss Fukushima, sent to Houston, now in a private collection
 Miss Gifu at the Cleveland Museum of Art in Cleveland
 Miss Gunma, sent to Brooklyn, now at the Morikami Museum and Japanese Gardens in Delray Beach, Florida
 Miss Hiroshima at the Baltimore Museum of Art in Baltimore
 Miss Hokkaido at the Putnam Museum of History and Natural Science in Davenport, Iowa
 Miss Hyogo at the St. Joseph Museum in Saint Joseph, Missouri
 Miss Ibaraki (Tsukuba Kasumi) at the Milwaukee Public Museum in Milwaukee - the Messenger of Friendship is again on display due to the tsunami and earthquake in Japan
 Miss Ishikawa at that Montana Historical Society in Helena, Montana
 Miss Iwate at the Birmingham Public Library in Birmingham, Alabama
 Miss Kagawa at the North Carolina State Museum of Natural Sciences in Raleigh, North Carolina
 Miss Kagoshima at the Phoenix Museum of History in Phoenix, Arizona
 Miss Kanagawa, sent to Eugene, Oregon, present location unknown
 Miss Kanto-shu (Manchuria), sent to Manchester, New Hampshire, now in a private collection
 Miss Karafuto, sent to Wilmington, Delaware, confused with Miss Nagano
 Miss Kobe-shi, sent to Stamford, Connecticut, present location unknown
 Miss Kochi at the Carnegie Museum of Natural History in Pittsburgh
 Miss Kumamoto, sent to New Orleans, present location unknown
 Miss Kyoto-fu at Boston Children's Museum in Boston
 Miss Kyoto-shi at the Arkansas Museum of Discovery in Little Rock, Arkansas
 Miss Miyazaki, at the Hennepin County Library in Minneapolis, Minnesota
 Miss Mie at the University of Nebraska State Museum in Lincoln, Nebraska
 Miss Miyagi, sent to Topeka, Kansas, now in a private collection
 Miss Nagano, sent to Providence, Rhode Island, now at the Delaware Historical Society in Wilmington, Delaware
 Miss Nagasaki (Tamako) at the Rochester Museum and Science Center in Rochester, New York
 Miss Nagoya-shi at the Atlanta History Center in Atlanta
 Miss Nara at the Idaho Historical Museum in Boise, Idaho
 Miss Oita at the Springfield Science Museum in Springfield, Massachusetts
 Miss Okayama at the North Dakota State University Textile Collection in Fargo, North Dakota
 Miss Okinawa at the Cincinnati Art Museum in Cincinnati
 Miss Osaka-fu, sent to Newark, New Jersey, now at the Ohio Historical Society in Columbus, Ohio
 Miss Osaka-shi at the Newark Museum in Newark, New Jersey
 Miss Saga, sent to Philadelphia, present location unknown
 Miss Saitama at the Charleston Museum in Charleston, South Carolina
 Miss Shiga, sent to Miami, present location unknown
 Miss Shimane at the Children's Museum of Indianapolis in Indianapolis
 Miss Shizuoka at the Kansas City Museum in Kansas City, Missouri
 Miss Taiwan at the Natural History Museum of Los Angeles County in Los Angeles
 Miss Tochigi, sent to Charleston, West Virginia, present location unknown
 Miss Tokushima at the Northwest Museum of Arts and Culture in Spokane, Washington
 Miss Tokyo-fu, sent to Richmond, Virginia, present location unknown
 Miss Tokyo-shi, sent to New York City, present location unknown
 Miss Tottori at the Museum of the South Dakota State Historical Society in Pierre, South Dakota
 Miss Toyama at the Speed Art Museum in Louisville, Kentucky
 Miss Wakayama at the Nevada Historical Society in Reno, Nevada
 Miss Yamagata at the Maine State Museum in Augusta, Maine
 Miss Yamaguchi, sent to Chicago, now at the Museum of International Folk Art in Santa Fe, New Mexico
 Miss Yamanashi at the Wyoming State Museum in Cheyenne, Wyoming
 Miss Yokohama-shi, at the Denver Public Library through the 1990s when it was entrusted to Denver Museum of Miniatures, Dolls and Toys after being restored

Legacy
Denny Gulick, grandson of Sidney, has tried to revive the doll exchange idea.

See also
Kokeshi doll, a similar concept

References

External links
 Dolls of friendship; the story of a goodwill project between the children of America and Japan,  by Committee on World Friendship Among Children. New York, Friendship Press 1929
 Miss Ibaraki at the Milwaukee Public Museum
 Entry on Miss Japan in the online artifact catalogue of the Department of Anthropology, National Museum of Natural History, Smithsonian Institution
 A Mission of Friendship at the Japanese American National Museum
 Milwaukee doll stars in Japan relief effort - April 27, 2011
 The Friendship Doll by Kirby Larson - published on May 10, 2011

Japan–United States relations
1928 introductions
Diplomatic gifts
Japanese dolls